Fred Sherry (born 1948) is an American cellist who is particularly admired for his work as a chamber musician and concert soloist. He studied with Leonard Rose at the Juilliard School before winning the Young Concert Artists International Auditions in 1968. In 1971 he co-founded the Speculum Musicae and in 1973 he co-founded the Tashi Quartet. Since the mid-1980s he has been a regular performer with Bargemusic and the Chamber Music Society of Lincoln Center, the latter of which he served as Artistic Director for between 1989–1993. He has appeared as a soloist with the Los Angeles Philharmonic, New Japan Philharmonic, Boston Symphony Orchestra, and L'Orchestre de la Suisse Romande. He currently serves on the faculty at the Juilliard School, the Manhattan School of Music, and Mannes College The New School for Music.

Discography

With Chick Corea
 The Leprechaun (Polydor, 1976)
Lyric Suite for Sextet (ECM, 1982) with Gary Burton
Children's Songs (ECM, 1983) 
Septet (ECM, 1984)
With Steve Swallow
Carla (Xtra Watt, 1987)
With John Zorn
Chimeras (Tzadik, 2003) 
Rituals (Tzadik, 2004) 
Magick (Tzadik, 2004) 
Mysterium (Tzadik, 2005) 
From Silence to Sorcery (Tzadik, 2007) 
What Thou Wilt (Tzadik, 2009)
Music and Its Double (Tzadik, 2012)
Fragmentations, Prayers and Interjections (Tzadik, 2014)

References

American classical cellists
Cello pedagogues
Living people
1948 births
Juilliard School alumni
Juilliard School faculty